Kim Ji-hyun (Hangul: 김지현; born August 16, 1972) is a South Korean singer and actress. She debuted in 1994 as a member of the best-selling pop group, Roo'ra, which she left in 1997 to release her first solo album, "Cat's Eye." Kim rejoined Roo'ra in 1999, and remained a member until the group disbanded in 2001. She released her second solo album, Second Time, in 2003, and participated in Roo'ra's reunion in 2009.

Discography

Filmography
Summertime (2001)

References

External links

South Korean film actresses
1972 births
Living people
South Korean women pop singers
South Korean female idols
20th-century South Korean women singers
21st-century South Korean women singers